Weranga is a rural locality in the Western Downs Region, Queensland, Australia. In the  Weranga had a population of 215 people.

Geography 
The Glenmorgan railway line traverses the locality from the south-east (Kumbarilla) to the south-west (Goranba). The locality is served by Weranga railway station on the Weranga North Road.

History 
The locality's name is derived from the parish name and from an early pastoral run established in 1848 by John and Alfred Crowder. The name is believed to be an Aboriginal word meaning a large gathering of Aboriginal Australians.

Weranga Provisional School opened in 1923, but closed in 1924.

In the  Weranga had a population of 215 people.

References 

Western Downs Region
Localities in Queensland